The Cedric class, formerly known as Arrow class, is a series of fast patrol/assault speed boats constructed by the Sri Lanka Navy for use by its littoral warfare units, the elite Special Boat Squadron (SBS) and the Rapid Action Boat Squadron (RABS).

The boat is capable of achieving high speeds and is highly maneuverable, meeting the requirements of these units in small boat operations. Armed with an autocannon or automatic grenade launcher as its primary weapon system and with multiple machine guns, the Arrow boats provides relatively high firepower despite its small size. It is also used by the navy for inshore monitoring operations.

History
The Arrow boat has been in service with the Sri Lanka Navy’s Special Boat Squadron since its development as part of the Inshore Patrol Craft Project. From mid 2008, it has also been issued to the newly created Rapid Action Boat Squadron. The Arrow boat was widely used by the Sri Lanka Navy against the LTTE’s Sea Tigers during the last phase of the Sri Lankan Civil War, known as the Eelam War IV.

The 100th Arrow boat was launched by the Sri Lanka Navy on 11 September 2008. A ceremony was held at the navy base SLNS Gemunu at Welisara to mark this event, presided over by the Secretary of the Ministry of Defence, Gotabhaya Rajapaksa.

In 2016, the boat was renamed in honor of Cedric Martenstyn, the Co-founder of the SBS and the lead designer of the boat.

Development
Designed under Commander Cedric Martenstyn according to the requirements of its elite unit, the Special Boats Squadron for a fast and maneuverable boat with high firepower, the navy developed the first prototype of the Arrow in 1994 and the boats were first used in combat in 2006. The navy produces the Arrow at a unit cost of Rs. 1.7 million (US$17,000).

Design
The Arrow boat is powered by a single  outboard motor. Another variant of the boat, fitted with two outboard motors has also been developed. The hull is made of strengthened fiberglass. The boat is 23.6 feet (7.2 m) long. No armour is provided, with the intention of keeping the boat light enough to meet the primary requirements of speed and maneuverability.

Armament
A 23 mm caliber autocannon is installed as the primary weapon of the Arrow boat, mounted in the bow. In some variants, this is replaced by an automatic grenade launcher, secondary armament consists of several PKM 7.62 mm machine guns mounted on each side of the boat.

Operators

 : Nine Arrow-class boats were exported to Nigeria in 2016 for the use of the Nigerian Navy in a deal worth USD 4.2 million.

References

External links
Picture at Lanka Daily News

Ships of the Sri Lanka Navy
Patrol boat classes
Landing craft
Military boats